Coleophora zapluta is a moth of the family Coleophoridae.

The larvae feed on the generative organs of Caroxylon aucheri.

References

zapluta
Moths described in 1992